John Alfred Baquie (10 July 1886 – 1 January 1968) was an Australian rules footballer who played with Melbourne and Carlton in the Victorian Football League (VFL).

Baquie, who came to Melbourne from Brunswick, was used as both a forward and rover during his league career. He transferred to Carlton after two seasons at Melbourne and participated in their losing 1909 and 1910 Grand Final sides. In the 1910 premiership decider, Baquie was reported by the umpire Jack Elder for striking and was suspended for all of the 1911 VFL season. He spent the time away at Seymour but returned for the 1912 finals series. His career ended back at Melbourne, where he returned in 1914 and played until 1920.

References

Holmesby, Russell and Main, Jim (2007). The Encyclopedia of AFL Footballers. 7th ed. Melbourne: Bas Publishing.

External links

 Blueseum: Jack Baquie
 DemonWiki profile

1886 births
Australian rules footballers from Melbourne
Melbourne Football Club players
Carlton Football Club players
Brunswick Football Club players
Seymour Football Club players
1968 deaths
People from Carlton, Victoria